Maxwell David Geismar (August 1, 1909 – July 1979) was an American writer, literary critic, and biographer.

He wrote a biography of Mark Twain. He penned the introduction to Eldridge Cleaver's Soul on Ice.

Geismar taught at Sarah Lawrence College for many years. He signed the Triple Revolution statement sent to President Lyndon Johnson in 1964.

References

1909 births
1979 deaths
20th-century American writers
20th-century American male writers